Roger Jenisch was a Republican member of the Illinois State Representative for a single term from 2005 to 2007.

Biography
Jenisch began his political career serving on a number of local boards and commissions including the Bloomingdale Commission and Zoning Appeals Board, Village of Addison Substance Responsibility Commission, and the Village of Addison Police Fire Merit Review Board. In 1997, after managing DuPage County Board member Floyd Sanford's successful campaign to become the Township Supervisor of Bloomingdale Township, Jenisch was appointed to replace Sanford on the DuPage County Board.

When then-State Representative Carole Pankau announced her plans to run for the Illinois Senate, Jenisch opted to run for her open seat in the 45th district. The 45th district included all or parts of Bloomingdale, Roselle, Glendale Heights, Carol Stream, Glen Ellyn, Itasca, Addison, Wheaton, and Winfield.

As a member of the Illinois House of Representatives he served on seven committees: Human Services, Insurance, Financial Institutions, Mass Transit, Revenue, Tourism and Conventions, and the KidCare Subcommittee. In 2006, property tax appeals attorney Franco Coladipietro, with the backing of local Republican organizations, challenged Jenisch in the Republican primary. Coladipietro won with a 6.2% margin of victory.

As of 2020, Jenisch is the managing broker and owner at EXIT Realty Redefined.

References

Year of birth missing (living people)
Living people
Republican Party members of the Illinois House of Representatives
County board members in Illinois